Mandva (also spelled Mandwa) is a small village and former princely state in present-day Gujarat state, western India.

History 

The petty princely state covered .
 
It ceased to exist on 10 June 1948 by accession to newly independent India's Bombay State. The privy purse was fixed at 18,720 Rupees.

Modern village 
The village lies between the Narmada River and GJ SH 160 in Bharuch district, Gujarat.

Places of interest 
There is a well in the villages which is similar to stepwell and had rooms in its walls to rest there in summer.

Connectivity 
Ankleshwar Airport  is a greenfield airport being constructed near Mandva village by the Gujarat Industrial Development Corporation.

The Gujarat State Aviation Infrastructure Company Limited (GUJSAIL) has acquired 80 hectares of land for the construction of the airport. GUJSAIL intends to develop an Aviation Maintenance, repair, and operations (MRO) facility at the new airport.

See also 
 Mandwa, village in Raigad district, Maharashtra, central India

References 

Cities and towns in Bharuch district